Oroluk Atoll is an atoll belonging to Pohnpei State in the Micronesia.

Description

The more than 25 sandy islets and banks, predominantly on the eastern rim of the atoll, have been washed away by cyclones through the years. Only one island remains, Oroluk Island in the very northwest corner of the atoll. Oroluk Atoll is believed to have been first discovered and named by navigators from Namoluk Island in the Mortlock Islands.

The inhabitants of Oroluk are only between five and ten in number. They come mainly from Sector 4 of the Kapinga Village in Kolonia, Pohnpei, and tend to the plantations of bananas and taro. A supply ship generally calls into the lagoon once every 6 months. The island can be contacted by SSB on the frequency 7876.5 daily at 0600Z for a period of 15 minutes.

Municipality
Oroluk municipality, which includes Oroluk Atoll and Minto Reef is one of the twelve municipalities of Pohnpei State.

History
Oroluk atoll It was discovered by Spanish navigator Alonso de Arellano in 1565 on board of the patache San Lucas, who charted it as Mira Cómo Vas (Look how you're going in Spanish). It was also later visited by the Spanish naval officer Felipe Tompson on 7 April 1773, who charted it as the Bajo Triste (the Sad Shoal in Spanish) due to its "horrible aspect" in his own words. Oroluk Island was charted by Tompson as San Agustín.

References

External links
 Heinrich Schnee, Deutsches Kolonial-Lexikon. Quelle & Meyer, Leipzig 1920, Band II, S. 684
 Havarie der Norna (1861)
 Pohnpei (Islas Carolinas Orientales) 3ª parte. Oroluk and Ngatik atolls (Spanish)

Atolls of the Federated States of Micronesia
Pohnpei